The 22nd Chess Olympiad (Olimpiada ha-shachmat ha-22), organized by FIDE, took place between October 26 and November 10, 1976, in Haifa, Israel. For the first time, the event comprised both an open and a women's tournament.

Another first was the change in format. The growing number of teams (74 at the previous Olympiad) had made it impossible to continue with the previous system of round-robin preliminary and final groups, so beginning in Haifa, the open event was played as a Swiss system tournament (the women's event had fewer participants and did not use the Swiss system until 1980).

The first Swiss system Olympiad ended up with significantly fewer teams, however. International politics once again interfered in the world of sports, as many FIDE member nations withdrew in protest against the Olympiad being held in Israel, a country many of them didn't recognize. Among the nations that stayed away from Haifa were all of the Arab countries, some of which took part in the alternative Against Chess Olympiad instead. Other absentees were the entire Eastern Bloc, including most of the usual medal candidates. A number of Eastern European players had recently defected, however, and now represented various Western countries.

In the absence of the Soviet Union, Yugoslavia, and Hungary, the US team had the highest average rating and had to be considered favourites, even without Bobby Fischer. In the end, they lived up to expectations and won the gold medals, by half a point. The Netherlands and England took home the silver and bronze, respectively.

Open event

Forty-eight nations played 13 rounds. In the event of a draw, the tie-break was decided first by match points, then by using the Buchholz system.

{| class="wikitable"
|+ Open event
! # !! Country !! Players !! Averagerating !! Points !! MP !! Buchholz
|-
| style="background:gold;"|1 ||  || Byrne, Kavalek, Evans, Tarjan, Lombardy, Commons || 2535 || 37 ||  || 
|-
| style="background:silver;"|2 ||  || Timman, Sosonko, Donner, Ree, Ligterink, Kuijpers || 2490 || 36½ ||  || 
|-
| style="background:#cc9966;"|3 ||  || Miles, Keene, Hartston, Stean, Mestel, Nunn || 2463 || 35½ ||  || 
|-
| 4 ||  || Najdorf, Panno, Quinteros, Sanguineti, Szmetan, Bronstein || 2513 || 33 ||  || 
|-
| 5 ||  || Unzicker, Pachman, Kestler, Mohrlok, Ostermeyer, Wockenfuss || 2485 || 31 ||  || 
|-
| 6 ||  || Liberzon, Kraidman, Dzindzichashvili, Lederman, Kagan, Birnboim || 2490 || 29½ ||  || 
|-
| 7 ||  || Hug, Lombard, Wirthensohn, Huss, Hammer, Ott || 2391 || 29 ||  || 
|-
| 8 ||  || Biyiasas, Day, Yanofsky, Amos, Lipnowski, Piasetski || 2428 || 28½ || 15 || 
|-
| 9 ||  || Pomar, Bellón López, Martín González, Medina García, Sanz Alonso, Ochoa || 2399 || 28½ || 12 || 
|-
| 10 ||  || Cuartas, Castro, Minaya Molano, García, de Greiff, Silva || 2365 || 28 ||  || 
|-
| 11 ||  || Øgaard, Hoen, Helmers, Hjertenes, Knudsen, Tiller || 2331 || 27½ || 16 || 
|-
| 12 ||  || Andersson, Ornstein, Jansson, Schüssler, Wahlbom, Schneider || 2453 || 27½ || 15 || 376.5
|-
| 13 ||  || Tatai, Toth, Grinza, Micheli, Paoli, Taruffi || 2385 || 27½ || 15 || 361.5
|-
| 14 ||  || Botterill, Williams, Hutchings, Cooper, Jones, Rayner || 2355 || 27½ || 15 || 359.0
|-
| 15 ||  || Franco Ocampos, Gamarra Cáceres, Bogda, Ferreira, Pane L., Ingolotti || 2216 || 27½ || 14 || 
|-
| 16 ||  || Silva Sánchez, Donoso Velasco, Frias Pablaza, Scholz Solis, Velasquez Ojeda, Godoy Bugueño || 2356 || 27½ || 13 || 380.5
|-
| 17 ||  || Jamieson, Fuller, Shaw, Rubanraut, Woodhams, Kellner || 2390 || 27½ || 13 || 367.5
|-
| 18 ||  || Robatsch, Dückstein, Hölzl, Janetschek, Wittmann, Röhrl || 2405 || 27½ || 13 || 366.0
|-
| 19 ||  || Westerinen, Rantanen, Raaste, Kanko, Saren, Vahtera || 2374 || 27½ || 13 || 346.5
|-
| 20 ||  || Torre, Balinas, Rodríguez, Mascariñas, Caturla, Estimo || 2418 || 27 || 17 || 
|-
| 21 ||  || Chandler, Green, Small, Smith, Cornford, Leonhardt || 2216 || 27 || 15 || 
|-
| 22 ||  || Sigurjónsson, Ólafsson H., Thorsteinsson, Sólmundarson, Pétursson, Víglundsson || 2426 || 27 || 13 || 
|-
| 23 ||  || Ostos, Palacios, Díaz, Sánchez, Schorr, Cúellar || 2275 || 26½ || 13 || 
|-
| 24 ||  || Rooze, De Bruycker, Beyen, Van Seters, Mollekens, Schumacher || 2326 || 26½ || 11 || 
|-
| 25 ||  || Rath, Øst-Hansen, Kølbæk, Rosenlund, Rosell, Mortensen || 2340 || 26½ || 10 || 
|-
| 26 ||  || Haïk, Preissmann, Puhm, Seret, Goldenberg, Letzelter || 2320 || 26 || 14 || 351.0
|-
| 27 ||  || Myers, Columna, Carrión, González, Malagón, Pérez || 2200 || 26 || 14 || 300.5
|-
| 28 ||  || Benítez, Bademian Orchanian, Ricetto, Silva Nazzari, Diano, Dienavorian Lacherian || 2203 || 26 || 13 || 
|-
| 29 ||  || Lozano, Aguilar, Rivera, Padilla, Luque, Becerra || 2200 || 26 || 9 || 
|-
| 30 ||  || Darakorn, Sinprayoon, Rasmussen, Sa-ngadsup, Trisa-Ard, Vajrabhaya S. || 2200 || 25½ || 12 || 
|-
| 31 ||  || Sharif, Harandi, Shirazi, Mamouri, Safarzadeh, Saloor || 2303 || 25½ || 11 || 367.5
|-
| 32 ||  || Vaglio Muñoz, Gutiérrez Mangel, Jiménez Molina, Salas Leal, Chaves, Sobrado || 2200 || 25½ || 11 || 324.0
|-
| 33 ||  || Pritchett, Levy, Jamieson, Findlay, Swanson, Bonner || 2321 || 25½ || 10 || 
|-
| 34 ||  || Browning, Blow, Whetton, Lainé, Denning, Taylor || 2200 || 25 || 14 || 
|-
| 35 ||  || Kernan, Ludgate, Doyle, Keogh, Kennefick, Delaney || 2214 || 25 || 12 || 
|-
| 36 ||  || Stull, Feller, Schammo, Schneider, Philippe, Milbers || 2250 || 24½ || 13 || 
|-
| 37 ||  || Pérez, Batres, Deras Díaz, Cote, Garrido, Larios || 2200 || 24½ || 12 || 321.0
|-
| 38 ||  || Hamada, Kuroda, Sakurai, Tatsutomi, Kanai A., Ozaki || 2200 || 24½ || 12 || 296.0
|-
| 39 ||  || Kan Wai Shui, Lo Y. Cheong, Sin Kuen, Ko Chi, Lam, Pang C. K. || 2245 || 24½ || 12 || 291.5
|-
| 40 ||  || Ramírez, Calle, Suarez S., García M., Rivas, Mendes J. || 2200 || 24½ || 11 || 
|-
| 41 ||  || Yerbury, Radford, Reichgeld, McDaniels, Marks, Jensen || 2200 || 24 ||  || 
|-
| 42 ||  || Gómez Abad, De la Casa, Martínez, Guijarro, Tarradellas || 2200 || 23 ||  || 
|-
| 43 ||  || Angles d'Auriac, Martelli R., Cary A., Negro, Kostjoerin, Lepine || 2200 || 22 ||  || 
|-
| 44 ||  || Petersen, Mikkelsen, Midjord, Ellefsen H., Petersen K., Thomassen J. || 2201 || 21½ ||  || 
|-
| 45 ||  || Rush, Markov, Earle M., Nacino T., Bluett N., Bell G. || 2200 || 18 ||  || 
|-
| 46 ||  || Abraham, Hoyt, Rumsch, Grumer, Hanno, Levenson G. || 2200 || 15½ ||  || 
|-
| 47 ||  || Hook, Georges, Pickering, Campbell, Linhart G., Corbin || 2203 || 13½ ||  || 
|-
| 48 ||   || Martina, Croes, Booi O., Brunk C., Tjinkamjet A. || 2200 || 7½ ||  || 
|}

Team standing 

The following ratings were used to determine the placement (#).
 BP (sum of board points)
 TP (sum of team points)
 Rtg (Buchholz scoring system)

{| class="wikitable"
!#||Team||Code||BP||TP||Rtg||+||=||-||1||2||3||4||5||6||7||8||9||10||11||12||13
|-
|style="background:gold;"|1 || ||USA||37||21||383.5||9||3||1||IRI3||CHI2½||SCO3½||ITA2||AUS4||NED1½||ENG2||ARG2½||GER2||ISR3½||SUI4||COL3||WLS3½
|-
| style="background:silver;"|2 || ||NED||36½||23||383.5||10||3||0||LUX3½||SCO2½||SUI2½||ARG2||NOR4||USA2½||ISR3||ENG2||CHI3½||SWE3½||GER2||CAN2½||FIN3
|-
| style="background:#cc9966;"|3 || ||ENG||35½||22||385.5||9||4||0||NZL2½||FRA4||ARG2½||GER2||ITA3||PHI3½||USA2||NED2||ISR2||CAN3||SWE3||CHI3½||AUT2½
|-
| 4 || ||ARG||33||20||389.5||9||2||2||VEN4||ESP2½||ENG1½||NED2||SUI3||GER2½||PHI3||USA1½||IRI3||AUT3||ISR2½||SWE2½||CAN2
|-
| 5 || ||GER||31||15||389.0||6||3||4||IRL3½||FIN3||AUT3½||ENG2||PHI1||ARG1½||ESP3||ISR1½||USA2||IRI4||NED2||SUI1½||AUS2½
|-
| 6 || ||ISR||29½||17||392.5||8||1||4||URU3½||AUS2½||SWE2½||SUI1½||DEN3½||ESP3||NED1||GER2½||ENG2||USA½||ARG1½||PHI3||PAR2½
|-
| 7 || ||SUI||29||17||365.0||8||1||4||AHO4||CAN2½||NED1½||ISR2½||ARG1||CHI½||DEN2½||THA3½||ESP2||COL3||USA0||GER2½||FRA3½
|-
| 8 || ||CAN||28½||15||372.5||6||3||4||MNC4||SUI1½||NOR1||IRI2½||SCO2||WLS3||ITA2||ESP2½||AUS2½||ENG1||ISL3||NED1½||ARG2
|-
| 9 || ||ESP||28½||12||355.0||5||2||6||ISV4||ARG1½||BEL2½||SWE2||VEN4||ISR1||GER1||CAN1½||SUI2||CHI1½||NOR2½||AUS1½||SCO3½
|-
| 10 || ||COL||28||14||352.5||6||2||5||PNG3½||SWE1½||ISL2½||VEN1½||FIN1½||PAR2||FRA3||SCO2½||NOR2||SUI1||AUT3||USA1||HON3
|-
| 11 || ||NOR||27½||16||362.5||6||4||3||THA2½||HON3½||CAN3||PHI1½||NED0||FIN2½||PAR2½||AUT2||COL2||ISL2||ESP1½||DEN2||VEN2½
|-
| 12 || ||SWE||27½||15||376.5||7||1||5||DOM3½||COL2½||ISR1½||ESP2||AUT2½||SCO2½||CHI2½||IRI1||PHI4||NED½||ENG1||ARG1½||DEN2½
|-
| 13 || ||ITA||27½||15||361.5||5||5||3||AND4||ISL3||PHI2||USA2||ENG1||IRI2||CAN2||CHI½||IRL2½||AUS1½||FRA2½||SCO2||BEL2½
|-
| 14 || ||WLS||27½||15||359.0||6||3||4||HON2||NZL2||LUX1½||PAR2||URU4||CAN1||VEN2½||AUS1||BEL3||FIN2½||CHI2½||ISL3||USA½
|-
| 15 || ||PAR||27½||14||345.0||6||2||5||FRA1||CRC2½||NZL2½||WLS2||LUX2½||COL2||NOR1½||BEL2½||URU2½||PHI1½||SCO1½||BOL4||ISR1½
|-
| 16 || ||CHI||27½||13||380.5||6||1||6||CRC3||USA1½||AUS2||URU3||ISL1½||SUI3½||SWE1½||ITA3½||NED½||ESP2½||WLS1½||ENG½||IRI3
|-
| 17 ||  ||AUS||27½||13||367.5||6||1||6||JPN4||ISR1½||CHI2||BEL4||USA0||ISL2½||IRI1||WLS3||CAN1½||ITA2½||PHI1½||ESP2½||GER1½
|-
| 18 || ||AUT||27½||13||366.0||6||1||6||GCI4||BEL2½||GER½||FIN2½||SWE1½||DEN3||ISL1½||NOR2||SCO2½||ARG1||COL1||CRC4||ENG1½
|-
| 19 || ||FIN||27½||13||346.5||6||1||6||IVB3½||GER1||DEN2½||AUT1½||COL2½||NOR1½||SCO2||BOL2½||ISL1½||WLS1½||LUX3||NZL3½||NED1
|-
| 20 ||  ||PHI||27||17||367.5||8||1||4||FAI4||DEN3||ITA2||NOR2½||GER3||ENG½||ARG1||ISL2½||SWE0||PAR2½||AUS2½||ISR1||URU2½
|-
| 21 ||  ||NZL||27||15||346.5||7||1||5||ENG1½||WLS2||PAR1½||CRC3||BEL1||DOM2½||LUX1½||JPN2½||DEN2½||IRL2½||THA3||FIN½||GUA3
|-
| 22 ||  ||ISL||27||13||350.0||6||1||6||HKG4||ITA1||COL1½||LUX3||CHI2½||AUS1½||AUT2½||PHI1½||FIN2½||NOR2||CAN1||WLS1||IRL3
|-
| 23 || ||VEN||26½||13||336.5||6||1||6||ARG0||PNG3½||MNC4||COL2½||ESP0||BEL2||WLS1½||URU½||THA1||JPN3||GCI3½||LUX3½||NOR1½
|-
| 24 ||  ||BEL||26½||11||341.5||4||3||6||GUA4||AUT1½||ESP1½||AUS0||NZL3||VEN2||IRL2||PAR1½||WLS1||FAI4||CRC2½||IRI2||ITA1½
|-
| 25 ||  ||DEN||26½||10||349.0||4||2||7||BER4||PHI1||FIN1½||IRL4||ISR½||AUT1||SUI1½||FRA2||NZL1½||DOM3½||IRI2½||NOR2||SWE1½
|-
| 26 ||  ||FRA||26||14||351.0||6||2||5||PAR3||ENG0||URU0||BOL4||GCI2½||GUA3||COL1||DEN2||DOM2½||SCO2||ITA1½||THA4||SUI½
|-
| 27 ||  ||DOM||26||14||300.5||6||2||5||SWE½||LUX½||BOL2||AHO4||CRC2||NZL1½||GUA2½||HON2½||FRA1½||DEN½||IVB3||AND2½||HKG3
|-
| 28 ||  ||URU||26||13||341.0||6||1||6||ISR½||JPN2||FRA4||CHI1||WLS0||HON2½||BER3||VEN3½||PAR1½||THA1½||IRL2½||GUA2½||PHI1½
|-
| 29 ||  ||HON||26||9||304.0||3||3||7||WLS2||NOR½||HKG2||THA1½||GUA1½||URU1½||ISV4||DOM1½||CRC½||AHO4||BOL2||FAI4||COL1
|-
| 30 ||  ||THA||25½||12||319.5||6||0||7||NOR1½||IRI½||BER3||HON2½||IRL1½||LUX1½||GCI4||SUI½||VEN3||URU2½||NZL1||FRA0||AHO4
|-
| 31 ||  ||IRI||25½||11||367.5||4||3||6||USA1||THA3½||IRL2||CAN1½||JPN4||ITA2||AUS3||SWE3||ARG1||GER0||DEN1½||BEL2||CHI1
|-
| 32 ||  ||CRC||25½||11||324.0||5||1||7||CHI1||PAR1½||ISV3½||NZL1||DOM2||IRL1||HKG3||GUA1½||HON3½||BOL2½||BEL1½||AUT0||MNC3½
|-
| 33 ||  ||SCO||25½||10||371.5||3||4||6||BOL4||NED1½||USA½||GCI4||CAN2||SWE1½||FIN2||COL1½||AUT1½||FRA2||PAR2½||ITA2||ESP½
|-
| 34 ||  ||GCI||25||14||298.5||7||0||6||AUT0||GUA3||FAI3½||SCO0||FRA1½||JPN2½||THA0||PNG3½||HKG2½||BER1½||VEN½||AHO3½||AND3
|-
| 35 ||  ||IRL||25||12||328.0||5||2||6||GER½||IVB4||IRI2||DEN0||THA2½||CRC3||BEL2||LUX2½||ITA1½||NZL1½||URU1½||MNC3||ISL1
|-
| 36 ||  ||LUX||24½||13||340.5||6||1||6||NED½||DOM3½||WLS2½||ISL1||PAR1½||THA2½||NZL2½||IRL1½||BOL2||GUA2½||FIN1||VEN½||ISV3
|-
| 37 ||  ||GUA||24½||12||321.0||6||0||7||BEL0||GCI1||PNG3||MNC3||HON2½||FRA1||DOM1½||CRC2½||JPN3||LUX1½||BER3||URU1½||NZL1
|-
| 38 ||  ||JPN||24½||12||296.0||5||2||6||AUS0||URU2||AND3||HKG3½||IRI0||GCI1½||FAI3||NZL1½||GUA1||VEN1||AHO3½||IVB2½||BER2
|-
| 39 ||  ||HKG||24½||12||291.5||4||4||5||ISL0||AND2||HON2||JPN½||PNG3||BER2||CRC1||FAI3||GCI1½||IVB3½||MNC2||ISV3||DOM1
|-
| 40 ||  ||BOL||24½||11||286.0||4||3||6||SCO0||ISV1½||DOM2||FRA0||AHO3½||AND4||PNG3½||FIN1½||LUX2||CRC1½||HON2||PAR0||IVB3
|-
| 41 ||  ||BER||24||14||290.0||5||4||4||DEN0||FAI2||THA1||ISV2½||AND2½||HKG2||URU1||MNC2||IVB3||GCI2½||GUA1||PNG2½||JPN2
|-
| 42 ||  ||AND||23||11||274.0||4||3||6||ITA0||HKG2||JPN1||FAI2||BER1½||BOL0||AHO3½||IVB3||MNC2||ISV3||PNG2½||DOM1½||GCI1
|-
| 43 ||  ||MNC||22||11||277.5||4||3||6||CAN0||AHO3½||VEN0||GUA1||ISV2½||FAI1||IVB3||BER2||AND2||PNG3½||HKG2||IRL1||CRC½
|-
| 44 ||  ||FAI||21½||12||277.0||5||2||6||PHI0||BER2||GCI½||AND2||IVB2½||MNC3||JPN1||HKG1||AHO3½||BEL0||ISV3½||HON0||PNG2½
|-
| 45 ||  ||PNG||18||6||280.0||3||0||10||COL½||VEN½||GUA1||IVB3||HKG1||AHO3||BOL½||GCI½||ISV3||MNC½||AND1½||BER1½||FAI1½
|-
| 46 ||  ||ISV||15½||6||283.0||3||0||10||ESP0||BOL2½||CRC½||BER1½||MNC1½||IVB2½||HON0||AHO2½||PNG1||AND1||FAI½||HKG1||LUX1
|-
| 47 ||  ||IVB||13½||1||283.5||0||1||12||FIN½||IRL0||AHO2||PNG1||FAI1½||ISV1½||MNC1||AND1||BER1||HKG½||DOM1||JPN1½||BOL1
|-
| 48 ||   ||AHO||7½||1||294.0||0||1||12||SUI0||MNC½||IVB2||DOM0||BOL½||PNG1||AND½||ISV1½||FAI½||HON0||JPN½||GCI½||THA0
|}

Individual medals

 Board 1:  Jan Timman 8½ / 11 = 77.3%
 Board 2:  Gennadi Sosonko 6 / 8 = 75.0%
 Board 3:  Marcelo Carrión 9 / 11 = 81.8%
 Board 4:  Michael Stean 5½ / 8 = 68.8%
 1st reserve:  Boris de Greiff 5½ / 7 = 78.6%
 2nd reserve:  Kim Commons 7½ / 9 = 83.3%

Women's event

Twenty-three nations took part in the women's Olympiad. From four preliminary groups the teams were split into three finals. Israel, led by former World Championship challenger Kushnir, won the gold, ahead of England and Spain.

Preliminaries

 Group 1: 

 Group 2:

 Group 3:

 Group 4:

Finals

{| class="wikitable"
|+ Final A
! # !! Country !! Players !! Averagerating !! Points !! MP
|-
| style="background:gold;"|1 ||  || Kushnir, Kristol, Podrazhanskaya, Nudelman || 2182 || 17 || 
|-
| style="background:silver;"|2 ||  || Hartston, Jackson, Pritchard, Caldwell || 2115 || 11½ || 8
|-
| style="background:#cc9966;"|3 ||  || Ferrer, García, Pino García Padrón, Canela || 1890 || 11½ || 7
|-
| 4 ||  || Savereide, Crotto, Herstein, Orton || 2112 || 10½ || 
|-
| 5 ||  || van der Mije, Vreeken, Belle, van der Giessen  || 2182 || 9½ || 
|-
| 6 ||  || Laakmann, Weichert, Prill-Gassemann, Wasnetsky  || 2070 || 9 || 
|-
| 7 ||  || McGrath, Kellner, Pope, Depasquale  || 1958 || 8½ || 
|-
| 8 ||  || Høiberg, Haahr, Larsen  || 1917 || 6½ || 
|}

{| class="wikitable"
|+ Final B
! # !! Country !! Players  !! Averagerating !! Points !! MP
|-
| 9 ||  || Vujosevic, Shterenberg, Day, Williams M. || 1907 || 13½ || 
|-
| 10 ||  || Gramignani, Pernici, Merciai, Romano D.  || 1800 || 12 || 
|-
| 11 ||  || Arias, Soppe, Cazón, Tadei  || 1800 || 11½ || 
|-
| 12 ||  || Healy, O'Siochrú, Noonan, Shouldice  || 1897 || 10½ || 
|-
| 13 ||  || Vuorenpää, Pihlajamäki, Ristoja, Laitinen  || 1852 || 10 || 
|-
| 14 ||  || Merlini, Tagnon, Ruck-Petit, Warkentin  || 1880 || 9½ || 6
|-
| 15 ||  || Leyva, Herrera L., Zapata, Patiño  || 1800 || 9½ || 5
|-
| 16 ||  || Cartel H. P., Emperado, Lizares A., Alvárez C.  || 1800 || 7 || 
|}

{| class="wikitable"
|+ Final C
! # !! Country !! Players  !! Averagerating !! Points !! MP
|-
| 17 ||  || Näpfer, Veprek, Wettstein, Ludwig || 1875 || 12 || 10
|-
| 18 ||  || Hausner, Hennings, Kattinger, Samt  || 1940 || 12 || 9
|-
| 19 ||  || Dahlin, Svensson, Svantesson, Bohmgren  || 2012 || 11½ || 
|-
| 20 ||  || Nakagawa, Watai, Maeda, Terada M.  || 1830 || 11 || 
|-
| 21 ||  || Elder, Hindle, Leask, Houstoun  || 1810 || 7½ || 
|-
| 22 ||  || Garwell, Brunker, Davies, Jarman  || 1800 || 6½ || 
|-
| 23 ||  || Terry L., Stretch, Hollis A.  || 1800 || 2½ || 
|}

Final «A»

Final «B»

Final «C»

Individual medals

 Board 1:  Alla Kushnir 7½ / 8 = 93.8%
 Board 2:  Nava Shterenberg 9 / 10 = 90.0%
 Board 3:  Hyroko Maeda 6½ / 8 = 81.3%
 Reserve:  Lea Nudelman 6½ / 7 = 92.9%

References

22nd Chess Olympiad: Haifa 1976 OlimpBase

22
Women's Chess Olympiads
Olympiad 22
Chess Olympiad 22
Olympiad 22
Chess Olympiad 22
International sports competitions hosted by Israel